Inferno Ridge is a narrow ridge,  long, rising between Schneider Glacier and Rennell Glacier in the Heritage Range, Antarctica. It was so named by the University of Minnesota Geological Party to these mountains, 1963–64, because the area is deeply dissected and composed of black rocks.

Features
Geographical features include:

 Larson Valley
 Orheim Point
 Rennell Glacier
 Schneider Glacier

References

Ridges of Ellsworth Land